Ralph E. DeCamp (September 17, 1858 - May 27, 1936) was an American painter and photographer. Born in New York, he grew up in Wisconsin and Minnesota before relocating to Montana, where he opened a studio in Helena. He did six murals in the Montana State Capitol in 1911 and four more in 1927. He lived in Chicago from 1934 to 1936, and he was buried in the Forestvale Cemetery, Helena. Many of his paintings and negatives are at the Montana Historical Society Museum.

References

1858 births
1936 deaths
American muralists
American photographers
Artists from Chicago
Artists from Montana
People from Helena, Montana
Photographers from Montana
19th-century American painters
20th-century American painters
19th-century American photographers
20th-century American photographers